{{DISPLAYTITLE:Benzoyl-beta-D-glucoside}}

Benzoyl-beta--glucoside is a benzoyl glucoside, a natural substance that can be found in Pteris ensiformis.

References

Benzoate esters
Glucosides